Reuben Franklin Beals (August 12, 1832 – December 31, 1916) was an American carpenter, farmer, and politician.

Beals was born near Cleveland, Ohio. He lived on the farm near Cleveland and went to the public schools. He moved to Illinois and eventually settled in Galva, Illinois. Beals was a farmer and a carpenter. He served in the 102nd Illinois Infantry Regiment during the American Civil War. Beals served on the Henry County, Illinois Board of Supervisors. Beals then served in the Illinois House of Representatives from 1891 to 1895 and was a Republican. He was also served as mayor of Galva. Beals died in Galva, Illinois.

Notes

External links

1832 births
1916 deaths
Politicians from Cleveland
People from Galva, Illinois
People of Illinois in the American Civil War
American carpenters
Farmers from Illinois
County board members in Illinois
Mayors of places in Illinois
Republican Party members of the Illinois House of Representatives